Hooker 'n Heat is a double album released by blues musician John Lee Hooker and the band Canned Heat in early 1971. The photo on the album cover was taken after Wilson's death, but his picture can be seen in a frame on the wall behind John Lee Hooker. Guitarist Henry Vestine was also missing from the photo session. The person standing in front of the window, filling in for Henry, is the band's manager, Skip Taylor. Careful examination of the photo reveals that Henry's face was later added by the art department. Although featured on the cover, vocalist Bob Hite does not sing on the album.

It was the first of Hooker's albums to chart, reaching number 78 in the Billboard charts. Hooker plays unaccompanied on side one and "Alimonia Blues"; on the remainder of side two and "The World Today" and "I Got My Eyes on You" Hooker is accompanied by Wilson on various instruments. The full band plays with Hooker on the rest of side three and all of side four.

The Penguin Guide to Blues Recordings describes the album as “one of the few occasions when younger musicians partnered [Hooker] to wholly beneficial effect.”

Track listing
All songs written by John Lee Hooker except as noted.

Charts

Personnel
Canned Heat
 John Lee Hooker - vocals, guitars
 Alan Wilson - harmonica; piano on "Bottle Up and Go" and "The World Today"; rhythm guitar on "I Got My Eyes on You" and "Peavine"
 Henry Vestine - electric guitar on "Whiskey and Wimmen," "Just You and Me," "Let's Make It," and "Boogie Chillen' No. 2"
 Antonio de la Barreda - bass
 Adolfo de la Parra - drums
 Bob Hite - producer

References

1971 albums
John Lee Hooker albums
Canned Heat albums
Liberty Records albums
Collaborative albums
Elektra Records albums
Albums produced by Bob Hite